West Newton is an unincorporated community in Allen County, in the U.S. state of Ohio.

History
West Newton was platted in 1850. A post office called West Newton was established in 1851, and remained in operation until 1910.

References

Unincorporated communities in Allen County, Ohio
1850 establishments in Ohio
Populated places established in 1850
Unincorporated communities in Ohio